Appellate Division may refer to:

 Bangladesh Supreme Court, Appellate Division
 New York Supreme Court, Appellate Division
 New Jersey Superior Court, Appellate Division

See also
Supreme Court of Prince Edward Island#Appeal_Division
Court of Appeal (disambiguation)
Court of Appeals (disambiguation)
State court (United States)#Nomenclature